William Bagley, is a former professional footballer, born  in Wolverhampton, who played as an inside left for Newport County and Portsmouth.

References

Portsmouth F.C. players
Newport County A.F.C. players
Footballers from Wolverhampton
Year of death missing
20th-century births
Association football inside forwards
English footballers
English Football League players
Place of death missing